Hugh Clifford, 3rd Baron Clifford of Chudleigh (14 April 1700- 26 March 1732) of Ugbrooke House near Chudleigh in Devon, was a peer.

Origins
He was the son of Hugh Clifford, 2nd Baron Clifford of Chudleigh (d.1730) by his wife Anne Preston.

Career
He succeeded his father as baron in 1730, but survived him by only two years when he was succeeded by his eldest son.

Marriage and children
In 1725 he married Elizabeth Blount, a daughter of Edward Blount of Blagdon in the parish of Paignton in Devon, 3rd son of George Blount, 2nd Baronet, of Sodington Hall in the parish of Mamble in Worcestershire, by his wife Annabella Guise, a daughter of Sir John Guise, 2nd Baronet of Elmore,  Gloucestershire. By his wife he had six children, four sons and two daughters as follows:

Sons
Hugh Clifford, 4th Baron Clifford of Chudleigh (1726–1783)
Hon. Edward Clifford (1727-1781).
Hon. Henry Clifford, died as infant.
Hon. Thomas Clifford (1732-1787) of Tixall, born on 22 August 1732 in London, died 1787. He acceded in Tixall, Staffordshire. On 2 February 1762 at St. James's Church, Westminster, he married Hon. Barbara Aston (1744-1786) the heiress of the estate at Tixall in 1759, the daughter of James Aston, 5th Lord Aston of Forfar (1723–1751) by his wife Lady Barbara (Maria) Talbot (1720–1759), a daughter of George Talbot and Mary FitzWilliam (and sister of the 14th Earl of Shrewsbury), and sister-in-law to Sir Walter Blount, 6th Baronet (died 1785) of Sodington. Barbara married with the consent of Edward Howard, 9th Duke of Norfolk, her great-uncle, who was her guardian, as specified in her late father's will.  The couple had nine sons:
Sir Thomas Hugh Clifford Constable, 1st Baronet Constable, of Tixall, co. Stafford (1762–1823)
Edward Clifford, born 1766, died young.
Henry Clifford, born 1768, died 1813, married Ann Ferrers, daughter of Edward Ferrers.
Walter Clifford, born 1773, died 1806 in Palermo, Sicily, became a clergyman.
Edward J. Clifford, born 1774, died ?, acceded 1817.
James Francis Clifford, born 1775, died 1855.
Arthur Clifford, born 1778, died 1830, was the publisher of Cliffordiana and Collectanea Cliffordiana. He married in 1809 Eliza Matilda McDonald, daughter of Captain Donald McDonald from/of Berwick-on-Tweed, Northumberland. They had one daughter:
Rosamund Clifford, who married J. S. Charlton.
Lewis Clifford, born 1778, died 1806.
George Lambert Clifford, born on 9 January 1779, died on 31 January 1854, married on 6 April 1812 Mary Coyney, who died on 22 July 1854, daughter of  Walter Hill Coyney of/from Foxearth, Staffordshire. They had five sons and three daughters.
Charles Clifford, 1st Baronet Clifford, of Flaxbourne, New Zealand (1813–1893)
Edward Clifford, a priest
George Clifford, a priest
Walter Clifford, a priest
Alphonso Clifford, born 1830, died 1893.
Mary Lucy Clifford, died 1868.
Constancia Clifford, died 1894.
Francesca Clifford.

Daughters
Hon Elizabeth Clifford, died as infant.
Hon. Mary Clifford, born 1731, died on 2 November 1784, married in 1766 Edward Smythe, 4th Baronet Smythe, of Eske Hall, Co. Durham (1719–1784). They had no issue.

Death and burial
He died on 26 March 1732 and was buried at Ugbrooke.

Notes

References

Clifford, Hugh Clifford, 3rd Baron
Clifford, Hugh Clifford, 3rd Baron
3